The 24th National Hockey League All-Star Game was held in the Boston Garden in Boston, home of the Boston Bruins. This was the first time that the all-star game was held in Boston. The West Division All-Stars defeated the East Division All-Stars 2–1. The West's Bobby Hull was named the game's most valuable player.

Uniforms
The West Division All-Stars continued to use the blue uniforms introduced in 1969. The East Division team, however, received updated white uniforms. The waistline color was changed from black to orange; the stars on the upper chest were enlarged, and had the NHL shield added inside them; the NHL shield was also added to the shoulders; the black numbers gained an orange outline; and the collar changed from an orange tie-up design to a black and orange V-neck.

The game

Game summary 

Goaltenders : 
 East: Giacomin (30:41 minutes), Villemure (29:19 minutes).
 West: T. Esposito (30:41 minutes), Wakely (29:19 minutes).

Shots on goal : 
 West (28) 13 - 8 - 7
 East (27) 13 - 12 - 2

Referee : Bill Friday

Linesmen : Neil Armstrong, John D'Amico

Source: Podnieks

Rosters

See also
1970–71 NHL season

References

 

All
National Hockey League All-Star Games
National Hockey League All-Star Game
National Hockey League All-Star Game
1971 in Boston
Ice hockey competitions in Boston